William Carey Graves (December 1, 1895 in Washington Parish, Louisiana – January 26, 1966 in Dallas, Texas) was a Democratic Texas State Senator for 4 terms and Majority Leader & Senate President for two of those terms. Graves was Governor of Texas for a day.

Education and early years
Carey Graves was educated in the public school system of Washington Parish, Louisiana. Graves' first job was that of farmer on his father's land. After graduating from High School, he married Elois Richardson Graves. He enlisted in the U.S. Navy as a Radio Operator on the U.S. Battleship New Jersey. In his spare time, he read the requirements to pass the Bar in the State of Texas. Elois and Cary Graves had one child, a daughter named Maxine Graves Price.

Legal and political career
Known politically as Bill Graves, Carey Graves arrived in Texas looking for every advantage a young state offered. Worked as a Locomotive Fireman on the New Orleans and Northern Railroad, while waiting on results from Texas State Bar Association.  Graves passed the Bar Exam the first time he sat for it. As an attorney, he worked on Bills for Old Age Assistance, Teacher Retirement, and Aid for the Blind, Aid for Dependent Children.

Career summary
- Assistant District Attorney of Dallas, Texas from 1920 to 1924

- City Judge, City of Dallas 1925-27

- Police and Fire Commissioner, City of Dallas, Texas. It was during Graves' time in office, he established a Criminal Investigation Department for Murder.

- Democratic Representative in the Texas Senate, from District 11

- Jan 10, 1939 - Jan 12, 1943 47th &  46th

- Jan 12, 1943 - Jan 14, 1947 49th & 48th  Majority Leader, Senate President Pro Tem, Ad Interim.

- Charter member of the Bonehead Club of Dallas

- Board Member of the State Board of Education from 1953 to 1966.

Governor of Texas for a Day
October 5–14, 1946, Texas Governor Coke R. Stevenson was called away from the State of Texas & on October 14, 1946 the Lieutenant Governor, John Lee Smith, was called away from the State of Texas; October 14, 1946 Senator Graves, as Majority Leader, was called to act as Texas Governor.

Committees served with the Texas Senate, District 11

49th R.S. - 1945
Commerce and Manufacturing (vice chair) 
Constitutional Amendments  
Finance  
Highways and Motor Traffic  
Insurance (Chair) 
Internal Improvements (vice chair) 
Military Affairs  
Penitentiaries  
Public Health  
State Affairs  
Veterans' Affairs

48th R.S. - 1943
Assignment and Employment, Special  
Commerce and Manufacturing  
Constitutional Amendments (chair) 
Contingent Expense  
Counties and County Boundaries  
Criminal Jurisprudence  
Feed Shortage, Investigation, Special  
Finance  
Insurance  
Judicial Districts  
Military Affairs  
State Departments and Institutions  
State Penitentiaries 
 
47th R.S. - 1941
Civil Jurisprudence  
Commerce and Manufactures (chair) 
Counties and County Boundaries  
Highways and Motor Traffic  
Insurance  
Labor (vice chair) 
Penitentiaries  
Public Health  
Public Printing  
State Affairs  
State Institutions and Departments 
 
46th R.S. - 1939
Civil Jurisprudence  
Commerce and Manufacturing  
Federal Relations (chair) 
Highways and Motor Traffic  
Insurance  
Internal Improvements (chair) 
Nominations of Governor  
Privileges and Elections (vice chair) 
Rules  
State Affairs  
Towns and City Corporations

References
D Magazine Article, Bill Graves

External links

 Legislative Reference Library of Texas http://www.lrl.state.tx.us/legeLeaders/members/memberDisplay.cfm?memberID=1481&leg=48&from=sessionList
 http://www.lrl.state.tx.us/legeLeaders/members/presprotem.cfm
 Obituaries and Tributes http://www.tributes.com/show/Maxine-Price-88307997
 http://www.sunset.drkinslow.com/memoriam.html

1895 births
1966 deaths
Texas lawyers
Texas state senators
20th-century American politicians
20th-century American lawyers